Lobatse is a town in south-eastern Botswana, 70 kilometres south of the capital Gaborone, situated in a valley running north towards Gaborone and close to the border with South Africa. Lobatse has a population of 29,772 as of 2022. The town is an administrative district, with a town council.

Government and infrastructure
Lobatse Senior Secondary School is located in Lobatse. The Botswana Prison Service (BPS) operates the Lobatse Prison. The High Court of Botswana has a branch in Lobatse. There is a psychiatric hospital known as Sbrana Psychiatric Hospital. The town is also home to the Botswana Meat Commission (BMC) which is one of the largest meat processing plants in Africa. Lobatse Stadium with a capacity of 20 000 seats is home to local sports teams.

Twin towns – sister cities
Lobatse is twinned with:
 Walvis Bay, Namibia

See also
Railway stations in Botswana
Lobatse Airport
https://www.botswanatourism.co.bw/explore/lobatse

References 

Populated places in Botswana